The 2008 Southland Conference baseball tournament was held from May 21 through 24. The top eight regular season finishers of the league's twelve teams met in the double-elimination tournament held at Don Sanders Stadium in Huntsville, Texas. The winner of the tournament, earned the conference's automatic bid to the 2008 NCAA Division I baseball tournament.

Seeding and format 
The top eight finishers from the regular season were seeded one through eight. They played a two bracket, double-elimination tournament, with the winner of each bracket meeting in a single championship final.

Results

All-Tournament Team 
The following players were named to the All-Tournament Team.

References 

Tournament
Southland Conference Baseball Tournament
Baseball in Texas
Southland Conference baseball tournament
Southland Conference baseball tournament